The St. Lawrence Parks Commission is a Crown agency of the Government of Ontario that manages parks and heritage sites along the shoreline of the St. Lawrence River in southeastern Ontario. It functions similarly to the Niagara Parks Commission's role in overseeing attractions and conservation on the Ontario side of the Niagara River.

List of Parks and Attractions
 Parks and Attractions
 Thousand Islands Parkway (including Ivy Lea Campsite, Brown's Bay Day-Use Area Park and St. Lawrence Recreation Trail)
 Riverside-Cedar Campsite
 St. Lawrence Recreation Trail
 Crysler Park Marina
 Crysler Beach
 Upper Canada Golf Course
 Upper Canada Migratory Bird Sanctuary
 Long Sault Parkway (including McLaren, Woodlands and Mille Roches)
 Farran Baker Park
 Glengarry Park
 Fort Henry National Historic Site in Kingston, Ontario
 Upper Canada Village Heritage Park
 Upper Canada Village
 Upper Canada Village Heritage Park Information Centre
 Queen Elizabeth Gardens
 Battle of Crysler's Farm Visitor Centre
 Pioneer Memorial

See also 
 Conservation authority (Canada)
 Conservation area
 Niagara Parks Commission
 St. Clair Parkway
 National Capital Commission
 Great Lakes / St. Lawrence Seaway System
 Ottawa River Waterway
 Rouge Park
 Ontario Parks
 Parks Canada
 Société des établissements de plein air du Québec (SEPAQ)
 Morrisburg Airport

External links 
 
 St. Lawrence Parks (park management section of the Commission)
 Fort Henry National Historic Site

 
Botanical gardens in Canada
Ontario government departments and agencies
1955 establishments in Ontario
Government agencies established in 1955